Way of the Blade is the first full length released by the band The Ottoman Empire (later known as Luna Mortis). It was released on October 17, 2006.

Track listing

 "Anemic World" - 6:34
 "Demon Twin" - 4:31
 "Ottoman Empire" - 5:53
 "Wrathshot" - 3:06
 "One if by Sea" - 7:52
 "Strike" - 5:40
 "The Mercenary" - 12:20
 "Vendetta" - 6:28
 "Interlude" - 1:34
 "Way of the Blade" - 5:54

References

2006 albums
Luna Mortis albums